Redeye Distribution, is an American independent record label based in Hillsborough, North Carolina, United States. It was founded in 1996 by Tor Hansen, Kim Hansen, Glenn Dicker. The label focuses on independent music.

History
Redeye is represented worldwide with U.S. offices in Hillsborough, NC, as well as San Francisco, Los Angeles, Chicago, Seattle, and New York City; and international offices in London, Berlin, Sydney, and Toronto.   The company is also a member of multiple industry-related organizations including Merlin, the Music Business Association, and A2iM.

Redeye owns and operates the Yep Roc Music Group, a label group that includes Yep Roc Records, Break World Records, and Studio One Records as well as the Riff City Sounds publishing company.

Redeye was awarded the National Association of Recording Merchandisers Distributor of the Year Award (Small Division) seven times in 2000, 2002, 2003, 2004, 2005, 2006 and 2007. The Music Business Association honored Redeye with the Independent Spirit Award at Music Biz 2016.

In December 2019, Redeye acquired major Swedish distributor Border Music. In January 2020, Redeye became the distributor of Domino Recording Company, Saddle Creek Records, and Beggars Group.

In July 2020, Redeye announced "staffing changes" to increase diversity following online blowback surrounding racial business practices and hostile work environments, which came shortly after the company announced their support via social media for the Black Lives Matter movement during the George Floyd protests.

Distributed labels

Alive Records
American Dreams Records
Analog Africa
Anticon Records
Ardent Records
Barsuk Records
Beggars Group
Brainfeeder
Break World Records
Brownswood Recordings
Bomp Records
Beyond Beyond Is Beyond Records
Carpark Records
City Slang Records
Daptone Records
Domino Recording Company
Don Giovanni Records
Double Double Whammy
Drag City Records
Erased Tapes
Everloving Records
Exploding in Sound
Fabric Records
Houndstooth
Fake Four Records
Fire Talk
Get Better Records

Greenleaf Music
Grönland Records
High Moon Records
Hyperdub Records
Innovative Leisure
International Anthem Recording Co.
Infinity Cat
Jazz is Dead
Jealous Butcher Records
Kill Rock Stars Records
The Leaf Label
Luaka Bop Records
Memphis Industries
Minty Fresh Records
Misra Records
Mom + Pop Music
N5MD
New West Records
Ninja Tune Records
Northern Spy Records
NNA Tapes
Outside Music
Partisan Records
Planet Mu Records
PNKSLM
Proper Records
Real Gone Music

Saddle Creek Records
Sargent House Records
Secret City Records
Signature Sounds Recordings
Slumberland Records
Soul Jazz Records
Spirit Of Spike Island
Stones Throw Records
Strange Famous Records
StorySound Records
Strut Records
!K7 Records
Studio One
Subliminal Records
Sundazed Records
Sunset Blvd Records
Three Lobed Recordings
Thrill Jockey
Topshelf Records
Tru Thoughts
Tzadik
Vizztone Records
Warp Records
We Are Busy Bodies
World Music Network
Yep Roc Records

International partners 
 Proper UK
 The Planet Company/MGM

References

External links
Official Site

Record label distributors
American companies established in 1996
Companies based in Hillsborough, North Carolina
1996 establishments in North Carolina